Israel and Spain have maintained diplomatic ties since 1986. Israel has an embassy in Madrid. Spain has an embassy in Tel Aviv, an honorary consulate in Haifa and a General Consulate in Jerusalem, which is regarded as diplomatic missions to the city of Jerusalem (including both West and East Jerusalem), Gaza and the territories of the West Bank. In additions to both countries being member states of the United Nations, both countries are members of the Union for the Mediterranean. The two countries are also involved with various programmes and agreements through the European Union, of which Spain is a member, and its relations with Israel.

History 

Spanish policy towards the Middle East was determined by the nature of the Francoist regime, and by post-World War II politics. Franco made some overtures towards Israel but short of recognizing the country, not least because the latter's government had no interest in being recognised by such a regime. This outright rejection from the newly created State of Israel towards the Francoist dictatorship was born out of domestic politics and ideological reasons. In 1949, the State of Israel voted against lifting sanctions against Spain in the United Nations General Assembly due to the Francoist regime's sympathy and material support for the Axis Powers. The hostility between both countries paved the way for Spain's fostering of relations with the unaligned Arab nations (nurturing the narrative of the so-called "traditional Hispano-Arab friendship"), which helped Spain to overcome international isolation. A cornerstone of Arab-Spanish friendship was the non-recognition of Israel. In these years, several editions of the antisemitic libel of The Protocols of the Elders of Zion were published in Spain, finding positive reception as factual truth among the most extreme factions of the regime. Despite the lack of diplomatic ties, the Franco government aided in Jewish emigration from Morocco in the 1960s and, during the Six-Day War in 1967, issued laissez-passer documents to Egyptian Jews, enabling them to emigrate.

The pro-Arab views of the previous Francoist regime had created a stance that was very difficult to overcome even after the transition to democracy. The first Spanish government after Franco's death, headed by Adolfo Suárez, declared that it would not recognize Israel unless it withdrew from the occupied territories and allowed the creation of a Palestinian homeland.

Following Suárez's resignation in 1982, the new President of the Government of Spain, Leopoldo Calvo Sotelo, seemed inclined to inaugurate relations between Spain and Israel but this had to wait for the next government due to the pro-Arab stance of the Foreign Minister José Pedro Pérez-Llorca, who argued against recognition as a response to Israel's links to the Sabra and Shatila massacre, and fears of an oil embargo as reprisal by Arab countries.

Nevertheless, small steps were taken towards rapprochement, including informal contacts by Samuel Hadas, the Israeli representative to the United Nations World Tourism Organization based in Madrid.  Hadas, a member of the Israeli Labor Party, was responsible for the creation of a Spanish Friends of Israel association and a dialogue group that included several Spanish Socialist Workers Party members of parliament, such as Enrique Múgica Herzog, as well as members of the ruling party, UCD.

With a view to establish full diplomatic relations with Israel, President of the Government Felipe González, who had been elected on a Socialist platform three years earlier, sent a personal letter to secretary general of the Arab League, Chedli Klibi, on 25 April 1985, advising him of Spain's plans. Following Operation Wooden Leg, the Spanish Government issued a strong condemnation of the attack, putting a temporary hold to the recognition process. Further conversations with ambassadors from Arab states in Madrid followed in January of the next year, advising them of Spain's forthcoming plans. Spain and Israel established diplomatic relations on 17 January 1986. Samuel Hadas was named Israel Ambassador in Madrid. Spain had joined the European Economic Community on 1 January. Soon after, a representative office for the PLO opened in Madrid "as evidence of Spain traditional policy of friendship with the Palestinian people and as an instrument to achieve a lasting, just and global solution to the Israeli-Arab conflict".

In 2000, Spain lifted its veto on Israel's admission to the Western European Group of the United Nations, on a basis of permanent renewal of temporary full membership, ending Israel's administrative limbo, as its membership in the Asian Group had been withheld due to the large majority of Muslim countries in the Asian block opposing.

In October 2011, Spanish Crown Prince Felipe and his wife, Princess Letizia, arrived in Israel for a two-day state visit to celebrate the 25th anniversary of the establishment of diplomatic relations and meet with local scientists.

Religious and cultural ties
Many Israelis are Sephardi Jews, culturally associated with the Iberian Peninsula from where Jews were expelled in the late-fifteenth century. Many Israelis are also of Spanish and Portuguese Jewish extraction from before the expulsion of Jews from the Iberian peninsula. Some Israelis live in Spain today, and there is also a small contemporary Spanish Jewish community. Many Spanish people are also of converso or marrano origin, with a recent study estimating the figure to be as high as 20%. An Israeli newspaper, Maariv, noted that José Luis Rodríguez Zapatero has said that his family is of Jewish descent, probably from a family of marranos.

In honor of the 25th anniversary of diplomatic and cultural relations between Spain and Israel, the Museo Nacional del Prado in Madrid loaned a painting by El Greco to the Israel Museum in Jerusalem. A special evening was held in the presence of Yitzhak Navon, the fifth President of the State of Israel and Alvaro Iranzo Gutierrez, ambassador of Spain in Israel.

Bilateral trade
Spanish apparel retailer Zara opened their first store in 1997 in Tel Aviv. As of 2020, Zara has 25 branches in the country.

In 2010, bilateral trade totaled 1.69 billion euros, with 853 million euros of Israeli exports to Spain and 836 million euros of Spanish imports to Israel. José Ranero, the economic and commercial advisor at the Spanish Embassy, said he looked forward to more joint projects, especially in technology.

Embassies 
The Embassy of Israel is located in Madrid, Spain. The Embassy of Spain is located in Tel Aviv, Israel.

See also 
 History of the Jews in Spain
 Alhambra Decree of 1492
 International recognition of Israel
 Israel–European Union relations 
 Palestine–Spain relations

References

Bibliography

 

Setton, Guy (2016), Spanish-Israeli Relations, 1956-1992: Ghosts of the Past and Contemporary Challenges in the Middle East. Sussex Academic Press. ISBN 978-1-84519-756-8

External links 
 Israeli embassy in Madrid 
 Spanish Ministry of Foreign Affairs about relations with Israel 
 Spanish embassy in Tel Aviv 

 

 
Spain
Bilateral relations of Spain
Jewish Spanish history